Crni Biseri (trans. The Black Pearls) were a Yugoslav rock band formed in Belgrade in 1963. The band were one of the pioneers of the Yugoslav rock scene.

The band started their career performing beat music, but later moved towards rhythm and blues. During the 1960s they became one of the most popular Yugoslav bands. Although their popularity heavily declined with the arrival of new musical trends and the new generation of Yugoslav bands at the beginning of the 1970s, they were one of rare Yugoslav 1960s bands to continue their career throughout the following decade. Although they recorded a large number of EPs and 7" singles, they released their only full-length studio album in 1976, disbanding in 1980.

History

1963-1970: beginnings, nationwide popularity
The band was formed in Belgrade at the end of 1963. The first lineup consisted of Goran Vukićević (acoustic guitar, keyboards and harmonica), Dragan "Krcko" Jovanović (drums) and Božović brothers, Ivan (guitar) and Slavko (saxophone). The band chose their name after 1958 Yugoslav film Crni biseri (Black Pearls), a story about a reform school teacher's efforts to bring a group of juvenile delinquents to the right path by teaching them diving. Crni Biseri had their first performance in the winter of 1963, in Belje, in Belgrade scouts winter house. Initially, the band performed without a bass guitarist, but were soon joined by the bassist and vocalist Vladimir Janković, also known as "Vlada Džet", who got his nickname ("Džet" being a transliteration for Jet) after The Shadows bass guitarist Jet Harris. Crni Biseri had their first performance with Janković on 8 March 1964 in Vuk Karadžić Cultural Center. The band was soon joined by the singer Radan Valčić. This lineup of the band performed until the Autumn of 1965, when they moved from beat to rhythm and blues and started performing in the following lineup: Goran Vukićević (guitar), Vladimir Janković "Džet" (bass guitar, vocals), Zoran Petković (rhythm guitar), Radan Valčić (vocals) and Dragan "Krcko" Jovanović (drums).

In April 1966 Crni Biseri released their debut EP, featuring covers of foreign hits, but also Janković's song "Ne odlazi" ("Don't Leave"), which was the result of the band's desire to be one of the first Yugoslav bands to record their own songs instead of covers of foreign songs. However, as the editors of Yugoslav record labels at the time had little faith in Yugoslav bands' own work, the members of Crni Biseri persuaded editors of the Jugoton record label to publish "Ne odlazi" telling them it is a cover of a Bob Dylan song. Other songs released on the EP were "Srce bez ljubavi" ("Loveless Heart", a cover of "Here's a Heart" by Dave Dee, Dozy, Beaky, Mick & Tich), "Nisam onaj koga želiš" ("I'm Not the One You Want", a cover "It Ain't Me Babe" by Bob Dylan) and "Lepi flamingo" ("Pretty Flamingo", a cover of "Pretty Flamingo" by Manfred Mann). The record was well received by the press. During this year, the band performed mostly in the club Euridika in Belgrade.

In 1967 Crni Biseri won the first place on the second Gitarijada Festival, held at the Belgrade Fair – Hall 1, and appeared in the Black Wave film When I Am Dead and Gone directed by Živojin Pavlović, playing a band which accompanies young singers on an audition. In 1967 the band also appeared in the TV show Koncert za ludi mladi svet (Concert for Crazy Young People) performing their songs "Ringišpil" ("Carousel") and "Hey Girl" and a cover of the song "Wild Thing". In the video recorded for their version of "Wild Thing", the band performed while riding a moving locomotive.

In 1968, Valčić decided to leave the band to dedicate himself to his studies of medicine, and was replaced by the former Duka & Čavke (Duka & the Jackdaws) frontman Nenad "Duka" Dukić. Dukić was already a well-known name on the music scene, with his song "San" ("A Dream") competing at Subotica Youth Festival. With him the band performed on a joint concert with the band Džentlmeni in Belgrade Youth Center. Dukić was a band member for only three months, but provided vocals for three cover songs released in 1968 on the band's second EP: "Dream" (a cover of Cupid's Inspiration song), "Moni, Moni" (a cover of Tommy James and the Shondells song "Mony Mony") and "I Wanna Be Free" (a cover of The V.I.P.'s song). The fourth song from the EP, "Nisam više taj" ("I'm not the One Anymore", a cover of "Suddenly You Love Me" by The Tremeloes), was previously recorded with Valčić. Although the EP received mixed reception by the critics, the song "Nisam više taj" became a large hit for the band, spending several weeks on the top of the charts in radio shows Minimaks (Minimax) and Sastanak u devet i pet (Meeting at 9:05). After Dukić's departure, Valčić returned to the band. In 1968, the band appeared in Stole Janković's film The Girl in the Park.

In 1969, Jovanović left the band, and the band's new drummer became Jovan Ljubisavljević "Kića", formerly of the band Gumene duše (Rubber Souls). In 1970, Valčić left the band being replaced by the former Juniori (Juniors) vocalist Dragan Baletić.

1970-1980: decline in popularity, disbandment
Crni Biseri were among rare Yugoslav beat bands which would continue their career during the 1970s; however, the band's popularity heavily declined due to the growing popularity of Yugoslav progressive rock bands. During 1973, the band made a break in their work due to Janković's and Baletić's mandatory stint in the Yugoslav People's Army. After their return from the army, the band continued their activity without Petković. For a certain time the keyboardist Dragan Batalo performed with the band, but soon moved to Zlatni Prsti, and was replaced by the keyboardist and singer Dragan Rajičević, a former Juniori member. In October 1976, Ljubisavljević left the band due to his army stint, and was replaced by Velibor "Boka" Bogdanović, who previously played in the bands Plavi Dečaci (Blue Boys), Duka & Čavke, Džentlmeni, YU Grupa, Opus and Dah. Having released their only full-length studio album, boogie rock-oriented Motorok (Motorock), in 1976, and the single "Ti si uvek htela sve" / "Moj brat i ja" ("You Alway Wanted It All" / "My Brother and I"), Dragan Baletić left the band and was replaced by a former Op Cup member Branislav "Cile" Živančević. In 1977. the band recorded a single featuring the songs "Hush Hush Maria" and "Night in Casablanca" under the name Denis. Three years later, on 1 January 1980, Crni Biseri officially disbanded.

During their career, Crni Biseri held about 3.000 concerts, performing, besides Yugoslavia, in Malta, Tunisia and Morocco. They also wrote songs for several plays of the Belgrade Drama Theatre.

1997 reunion
In 1997, the band reunited with vocalists Dragan Baletić and Branislav Živančević to hold a concert in the club Crna Maca in Belgrade. The concert was recorded and broadcast by Radio Television of Serbia. During the following year, the compilation album Crni Biseri was released, featuring several previously unreleased songs: instrumental track "Mesto pod suncem" ("A Spot under the Sun", a cover of the theme from the 1959 film A Summer Place), which is the band's first studio recording, "Moja draga" ("My Darling"), "Kamena vizija" ("Stone Vision", a cover of "Tips of My Fingers" by P. J. Proby) and "Hey Girl".

Post breakup
After he left Crni Biseri in 1968, Nenad Dukić withdrew from music, and later became a film critic.

After Crni Biseri disbanded, Janković formed the band Tunel with former S Vremena Na Vreme member Ljuba Ninković and former SOS member Steva Stevanović. He started working as an editor on Radio 202, and later in the record company ITMM. With Jovan Ljubisavljević "Kića" and guitarist Boban Birtašević (a former Siluete member) he formed his Vlada Džet Band.

Dragan Baletić died on 14 May 2005.

Legacy
Crni Biseri song "Džudi, Džudi" was covered by Yugoslav and Serbian folk rock band Garavi Sokak in 1991.

Band members
Goran Vukićević – guitar, acoustic guitar, keyboards, harmonica (1963–1980)
Ivan Božović – guitar (1963–1965)
Slavko Božović – saxophone (1963–1965)
Dragan Jovanović "Krcko" – drums (1963–1968)
Vladimir Janković "Džet" – bass guitar, vocals (1964–1980)
Radan Valčić – vocals (1964–1968; 1968–1970)
Zoran Petković – guitar (1965–1973)
Jovan Ljubisavljević "Kića" – drums (1968–1976)
Nenad Dukić – vocals (1968)
Dragan Baletić – vocals (1970–1977)
Dragan Batalo – keyboards (1974)
Dragan Rajičević – keyboards, vocals (1975–1980)
Velibor Bogdanović "Boka" – drums (1976–1980)
Branislav Živančević "Cile" – vocals (1977–1980)

Discography

Studio albums 
 Motorok (1976)

Compilation albums 
 Crni Biseri (1998)

Extended plays 
 Ne odlazi (1967)
 Nisam više taj (1968)
 Kišna noć (1972)

Singles 
 "Moja mala ledi" / "Moj svet nije tvoj svet" (1968)
 "Tražimo sunce" / "Ram-dam-dam" (1969)
 "Poučna priča / "Čekanje" (1970)
 "Ona zna" / "Povratak" (1972)
 "Lutalica" / "Pismo devojci" (1973)
 "Večiti rok" / "Želim" (1975)
 "Dar-mar" / "Šta ću sad" (1975)
 "Džudi, Džudi" / "Nikada" (1976)
 "Mlinarev sin" / "Tiho muzika svira" (1976)
 "Ti si uvek htela sve" / "Moj brat i ja" (1977)
 "Katarina (Ne želi da živi više sa mnom)" / "Moreplovac" (1977)
 "Hush Hush Maria" / "Night in Casablanca" (as Denis, 1977)
 "Aspirin" / "Susret na uglu" (1978)
 "Tašta" / "Zimski dan" (1979)

References

External links 
 Crni Biseri at Discogs
 Crni Biseri at Last.fm
 Crni Biseri at Rateyourmusic
 

Serbian rock music groups
Serbian rhythm and blues musical groups
Yugoslav rock music groups
Yugoslav rhythm and blues musical groups
Beat groups
Musical groups from Belgrade
Musical groups established in 1963
Musical groups disestablished in 1980
1963 establishments in Yugoslavia